Winklern is a town in the district of Spittal an der Drau in the Austrian state of Carinthia.

Geography
The municipality lies at the foot of the Großglockner massif between the Schober, Goldberg, and Kreuzeck groups in the upper Möll valley.

References

Cities and towns in Spittal an der Drau District
Kreuzeck group
Goldberg Group
Schober Group